Bear Behaving Badly is a British children's sitcom which originally aired for four series and was broadcast between 3 September 2007 and 21 December 2010.

Background
The programme is centred around the daily adventures of Barney Harwood, his pet bear Nev, his koala friend Crazy Keith and the caretaker of the trio's flat, Andy Prank. Nev and Barney originally appeared together on Sunday morning children's programme Smile, which ceased in 2007. The events of the programme take place at some point after Smile. The programme features the voices of Ross Mullan as Nev and Simon Buckley as Keith, with legendary actress Bella Emberg playing the role of Barney's Aunt Barbara. A series of twenty-six episodes was commissioned by the BBC in March 2007, after a trailer for the proposed series being uploaded to YouTube received over 1 million hits. Following successful ratings, a second series of twenty-six episodes followed in December 2008. Both series were originally broadcast on BBC One, before being repeated in an early morning slot on BBC Two. In August 2009, a third series of thirteen episodes was filmed. These episodes began airing from 7 December 2009, this time on the CBBC Channel, before later being repeated on BBC One. In July 2010, a fourth series of thirteen episodes was filmed. These episodes began airing from 6 October 2010. The series concluded on 21 December 2010, and thus far, no further episodes have been filmed or broadcast, with the exception of repeats.

Synopsis
The action of Bear Behaving Badly is centered on an apartment block owned by Barney's wealthy uncle Rupert Silverspoon. There are three flats on the ground floor. Barney and Nev live in Flat 1, Beatrice lives in Flat 2, and the caretaker, Mr Prank, lives in Flat 3. There are at least 5 more flats upstairs, one of which Aunt Barbara lives in. A door under the stairs leads down to the boiler room. Barney is a children's television presenter. He doesn't own a car and instead travels everywhere by tricycle or takes the bus. Barney and Beatrice share a mutual affection, though sometimes Barney is a bit shy when talking to her. Mr Prank has an obsequious attitude towards Barney whom he frequently addresses as "Mr Barney, Sir." This feigned respect is on account of the fact that Barney's uncle is his employer. In addition Prank runs his own ice cream business from his ice cream van which is often seen parked outside the apartment block. Aunt Barbara does not know about Mr Prank's ice cream and constantly refers to it as a 'rusty old thing' and demands the owner (Mr Prank) should be locked up.  He is allergic to Nev's blue fur but pretends to like him when Barney is nearby. As soon as Barney is out of sight, Prank is nasty to Nev and makes his life a misery. Sometimes Nev retaliates by snarling, blowing a raspberry at him, or even kissing him on the nose, causing him to sneeze. Nev has a favorite cuddly toy which he calls his Snuggly Ducky Duck Duck. He also likes to have plastic ducks floating in the water when he has a bath. Despite starring in a programme called Bear Behaving Badly, Nev usually tries to do the right thing, and only misbehaves as a response to difficult circumstances or situations. He likes ice cream, jam, rubber ducks and socks.

Characters

Transmissions

Episodes

2016 Live UK tour
It was announced that Bear Behaving Badly would go on a UK tour in 2016. Glen Davies who played Mr Prank in the TV series would have been on the tour, Barney Harwood would have featured in the show by pre-recorded video link, and would not appear in person. There would have been 21 shows starting from Friday 18 March 2016 – 5 June 2016. The show had later been cancelled, due to low ticket sales.

Tour dates

Home media
One Bear Behaving Badly DVD was released in 2008 and features episodes from the first series. It was released by HIT Entertainment.

References

External links 
 
 

British children's fantasy television series
BBC Television shows
BBC children's television shows
British television shows featuring puppetry
2000s British children's television series
2010s British children's television series
2007 British television series debuts
2010 British television series endings
English-language television shows
Television series about bears
CBBC shows
Television shows shot at Teddington Studios